Salvia qimenensis is a perennial or biennial herb that is native to Anhui province in China, typically growing on hillsides. Inflorescences are 6-flowered widely spaced verticillasters in racemes or panicles, with a  purple to white corolla.

Notes

qimenensis
Flora of China